Lisa Hepfner  (born 1971) is a Canadian politician who was elected to represent the riding of Hamilton Mountain in the House of Commons of Canada in the 2021 Canadian federal election. Prior to her election to the House of Commons, she was a television news journalist for CHCH News.

Electoral Record

References

External links 
 

Living people
Canadian women television journalists
Journalists from Ontario
People from Oakville, Ontario
Politicians from Hamilton, Ontario
Members of the House of Commons of Canada from Ontario
Liberal Party of Canada MPs
Women in Ontario politics
Women members of the House of Commons of Canada
21st-century Canadian journalists
21st-century Canadian politicians
21st-century Canadian women politicians
1971 births